Trilogia 1983–1989 live 2013 is a live album from Italian rock band Litfiba. It was recorded in Milan during the 2013 tour.

Track listing

CD 1
"Eroi nel vento" 
"Tziganata" 
"La preda" 
"Transea" 
"Istanbul" 
"Guerra" 
"Versante est" 
"Apapaia" 
"Pierrot e la luna" 
"Ballata" 
"Elettrica danza"

CD 2
"Re del silenzio" 
"Gira nel mio cerchio" 
"Cane" 
"Ferito" 
"Louisiana" 
"Il vento" 
"Santiago" 
"Ci sei solo tu" 
"Corri" 
"Amigo" 
"Resta"
"Tex"

Personnel
Piero Pelù - Vocals
Ghigo Renzulli - Guitars
Antonio Aiazzi – Keyboards
Gianni Maroccolo - Bass
Luca Martelli - Drums

Litfiba albums
2013 live albums
Italian-language albums